Claire Feuerstein and Stéphanie Foretz Gacon were the defending champions, but Foretz Gacon chose not to participate, Feuerstein partnered up with Iryna Brémond but lost in the first round to Caroline Garcia and Aurélie Védy. 
Caroline Garcia and Aurélie Védy defeated Anastasia Pivovarova and Olga Savchuk in the final 6–3, 6–3.

Seeds

Draw

Draw

References
 Main Draw

Open International Feminin Midi-Pyrenees Saint-Gaudens Comminges - Doubles